Andrew Greene (born September 24, 1969, in Kingston, Jamaica) is a former professional Canadian football offensive tackle. Greene, a nine-year Canadian Football League veteran, has spent much of his career with the Saskatchewan Roughriders. The four-time CFL all-star was named the league's top offensive lineman in 2003.

High school years
At Pickering High School in Ajax, Ontario, Greene lettered in football, basketball, rugby, and track & field.

College years
At Indiana University Bloomington, Greene was a four-year letterman and a three-year starter. He was named twice named "Indiana's Outstanding Offensive Lineman", and as a senior, also won first-team All-Big Ten Conference honors and was a second-team All-American.

Professional career
Greene joined the Roughriders in 1997 after spending time with the Miami Dolphins, Seattle Seahawks and Jacksonville Jaguars of the NFL. He has appeared in 116 regular season games, nine playoff games and one Grey Cup. On February 21, 2007, Greene signed as a free agent with the Winnipeg Blue Bombers, starting all 18 games for them. He even went on to play for the Bombers in the 95th Grey Cup in Toronto, only to lose to his former team, the Roughriders. On September 17, 2008, Greene signed with the Toronto Argonauts and was assigned to their practice roster. At the time of his signing, he became the oldest active player in the CFL.

On January 26, 2009, Greene was released by the Argonauts.

On May 25, 2009 the Saskatchewan Roughriders signed Greene after which he promptly announced his retirement showing his desire to retire as a Roughrider. Saskatchewan Roughrider Club President/CEO Jim Hopson stated, "When a player such as Andrew wants to end a long successful career in Green and White, we gladly do our part to help. It's our way of showing appreciation for all the years of dedication and hard work he put into this organization."

External links
Canadian Football League profile

1969 births
Living people
Black Canadian players of Canadian football
Canadian football offensive linemen
Canadian people of Jamaican descent
Canadian players of American football
Indiana Hoosiers football players
Jacksonville Jaguars players
Miami Dolphins players
Saskatchewan Roughriders players
Seattle Seahawks players
Sportspeople from Kingston, Jamaica
Sportspeople from Ontario
Toronto Argonauts players
Winnipeg Blue Bombers players